Satan Triumphant (translit. Satana likuyushchiy) is a 1917 silent film in Russian directed by Yakov Protazanov.

The film has not survived in its entirety; the endings of both episodes are missing.

Some of the film's inscriptions were lost. They were restored thanks to the help of Rolf Lindfors, the Curator of the Swedish Film Archives, who found the film's inscriptions in the Swedish Film Censorship Archive.

It also became known that in 1919 the film was forbidden by the Swedish censorship to be shown in the country.

Plot
Pastor Talnoх furiously urges the flock to fight temptations, but he himself becomes a victim of temptation. In his house appears Satan, pushing the hero to theft and spiritual fall.

Cast (in credits order)
Pavel Pavlov as Pavel, painter, hunchback
Aleksandr Chabrov as Satan
Natalya Lisenko as Esther, Sandro's mother 
Ivan Mozzhukhin as Pastor Talnoх and his son Sandro van Gauguin
Vera Orlova as Inga

See also
 Deals with the Devil in popular culture

References

External links

1917 films
Russian silent films
Russian black-and-white films
Films of the Russian Empire
Films directed by Yakov Protazanov
Articles containing video clips
Russian drama films
1917 drama films
1910s Russian-language films
Silent drama films